Bosnia and Herzegovina competed at the 2003 World Championships in Athletics from 23 – 31 August 2003.

Results

Men

See also
 Bosnia and Herzegovina at the World Championships in Athletics

References 

World Championships in Athletics

Nations at the 2003 World Championships in Athletics
2003